Skjønsberg is a surname. Notable people with the surname include:

 Kari Skjønsberg (1926–2003), Norwegian writer
 Morten Skjønsberg (born 1983), Norwegian footballer 
 Simen Skjønsberg (1920–1993), Norwegian journalist 
 Tor Skjønsberg (1903-1993), Norwegian resistance leader